
Racibórz County is a unit of territorial administration and local government (powiat) in Silesian Voivodeship, southern Poland, on the Czech border. It came into being on January 1, 1999, as a result of the Polish local government reforms passed in 1998.

As of 2019 its total population is 108,388, out of which the population of Racibórz is 54,778, that of Kuźnia Raciborska is 5,359, that of Krzanowice is 2,157, and the rural population is 46,094.

Neighbouring counties
Racibórz County is bordered by Głubczyce County to the west, Kędzierzyn-Koźle County to the north, Gliwice County to the north-east, and the city of Rybnik, Rybnik County and Wodzisław County to the east. It also borders the Czech Republic to the south.

Administrative division
The county is subdivided into eight gminas (one urban, two urban-rural and five rural). These are listed in the following table, in descending order of population.

See also 
Silesia Euroregion

References

 
Land counties of Silesian Voivodeship